Ülo Krigul (born 7 November 1978 in Tallinn) is an Estonian composer.

In 1997 he graduated from Tallinn Music High School. In 2006 he graduated from the Estonian Academy of Music and Theatre specialising in composition.

He has been a music organizer; from 1995 to 1999 he belonged to the staff of the jazz festival Jazzkaar. From 2005 to 2014 he was one of the artistic directors of the Estonian Music Days.

He has also been a member (being a keyboard player or arranger) of several rock and jazz ensembles, e.g. Compromise Blue and Contus Firmus.

Since 2003 he has been a member of the Estonian Composers' Union.

Krigul's younger brother is classical musician Vambola Krigul.

Works

References

Living people
1978 births
21st-century Estonian composers
Estonian Academy of Music and Theatre alumni
Tallinn Music High School alumni
Musicians from Tallinn